Howlettes Mead is a Grade II listed detached house at 48 College Road in Dulwich Village, in the London Borough of Southwark, SE21. The house is set in 2 acres of grounds. It was built in 1777 and altered in the early 19th-century. The house has 3 storeys with 2 main bays and a porch with Doric pilasters

References

Grade II listed houses in London
Grade II listed buildings in the London Borough of Southwark
Dulwich
Houses completed in 1777
Houses in the London Borough of Southwark